Actophilornis is a genus of jacana. It contains two species restricted to Africa and its surrounding islands.

Taxonomy
The genus Actophilornis was introduced in 1925 by the American ornithologist Harry C. Oberholser with the African jacana as the type species. Actophilornis was a replacement name for Actophilus which was pre-occupied. The name combines the Ancient Greek aktē meaning "river bank" or "coastal strand", -philos meaning "-loving" and ornis meaning "bird".

The genus contains two species:
 African jacana, Actophilornis africanus
 Madagascar jacana, Actophilornis albinucha

References

 
Bird genera
 
Taxa named by Harry C. Oberholser